Ramazzini is an Italian surname. Notable people with the surname include:

Bernardino Ramazzini - Italian physician (1633 – 1714)
 Collegium Ramazzini academy of occupational and environmental health named after Bernardino
Álvaro Leonel Ramazzini Imeri - Guatemalan Bishop, born 1947

Italian-language surnames